Tom Sukanen (born Tomi Jaanus Alankola; 1878 – April 23, 1943), was a Finnish-born sailor, farmer and Canadian. He immigrated to Minnesota at the age of 20, where he married and became a farmer. In 1911, he left his wife and farm and walked to Saskatchewan where his brother Svante Sukanen was living. Tom then began a homestead in the Macrorie area farmed there for seven years. Returning to Minnesota, he found that his wife had died, their children living in foster homes, and their farm abandoned. He attempted to bring his son back to Saskatchewan, but the boy was turned back at the Canada–US border. In 1929, the height of the Great Depression he made a laborious return voyage to Finland for a visit. Upon his return he set to building a sea vessel to facilitate his permanent repatriation to his homeland.

Cultural legacy

Tom Sukanen has been the inspiration for a number of plays and artworks. Ken Mitchell's play The Shipbuilder is based on Sukanen's story, as is Andreas Schroeder's novel, Dustship Glory. The 2009 film Sisu, directed and written by Chrystene R. Ells, and the 1985 short film Shipbuilder by Stephen Surjik are both retellings of his story.  He is the namesake of the Sukanen Ship Pioneer Village and Museum.

References

Finnish emigrants to Canada
Canadian shipbuilders
Boat and ship designers
1878 births
Year of death missing
Finnish emigrants to the United States (1809–1917)